In the study of geometric algebras, a -blade or a simple -vector is a generalization of the concept of scalars and vectors to include simple bivectors, trivectors, etc. Specifically, a -blade is a -vector that can be expressed as the exterior product (informally wedge product) of 1-vectors, and is of grade .

In detail:

A 0-blade is a scalar.
A 1-blade is a vector.  Every vector is simple.
A 2-blade is a simple bivector. Sums of 2-blades are also bivectors, but not always simple. A 2-blade may be expressed as the wedge product of two vectors  and :

In a vector space of dimension , a blade of grade  is called a pseudovector or an antivector.
The highest grade element in a space is called a pseudoscalar, and in a space of dimension  is an -blade.

A vector subspace of finite dimension  may be represented by the -blade formed as a wedge product of all the elements of a basis for that subspace. Indeed, a -blade is naturally equivalent to a -subspace endowed with a volume form (an alternating -multilinear scalar-valued function) normalized to take unit value on the -blade.

Examples
In two-dimensional space, scalars are described as 0-blades, vectors are 1-blades, and area elements are 2-blades in this context known as pseudoscalars, in that they are elements of a one-dimensional space distinct from regular scalars.

In three-dimensional space, 0-blades are again scalars and 1-blades are three-dimensional vectors, while 2-blades are oriented area elements. In this case 3-blades are called pseudoscalars and represent three-dimensional volume elements, which form a one-dimensional vector space similar to scalars. Unlike scalars, 3-blades transform according to the Jacobian determinant of a change-of-coordinate function.

See also
Grassmannian
Multivector
Exterior algebra
Differential form
Geometric algebra
Clifford algebra

Notes

References

A Lasenby, J Lasenby & R Wareham (2004) A covariant approach to geometry using geometric algebra Technical Report. University of Cambridge Department of Engineering, Cambridge, UK.

External links
A Geometric Algebra Primer, especially for computer scientists.

Geometric algebra
Vector calculus